The 1998 Auckland Warriors season was the  4th in the club's history. Coached by Frank Endacott and captained by Matthew Ridge, they competed in the 1998 NRL season, finishing the regular season 15th (out of 20 teams).

Milestones
10 April – Round 5: Joe Vagana plays his 50th match for the club.
19 April – Round 6: Syd Eru plays his 50th match for the club.

Jersey & Sponsors
 For 1998 the Warriors again used a similar style of jersey, produced by Nike, Inc. DB Bitter remained the major sponsor while Bartercard joined as the sleeve sponsor.

Fixtures 

The Warriors used Ericsson Stadium as their home ground in 1997, their only home ground since they entered the competition in 1995.

Pre-season trials

Regular season

Kiwi Trial matches
After the National Rugby League season had finished the Warriors played in two trial matches against a New Zealand XIII. These matches acted as a trial for the New Zealand national rugby league team before the October test against Australia and the tour of Great Britain.

Ladder

Squad 

Twenty nine players were used by the club in 1998, including four players who made their first grade debuts.

Staff
 Chief Executive Officer: Bill MacGowan

Coaching Staff
 Head Coach: Frank Endacott

Transfers

Gains

Losses

Mid-Season Losses

Other Teams
Due to the axing of the Reserve grade competition the Auckland Warriors reserve team played in a series of matches against New Zealand Provincial sides.

Awards
Joe Vagana was the Player of the Year.

References

External links
 Warriors official site
 1998 Warriors Season at rugbyleagueproject.org

New Zealand Warriors seasons
Auckland Warriors season
War